Arbuzovka is a rural locality (a selo) in Kolyvansky Selsoviet, Pavlovsky District, Altai Krai, Russia. The population was 270 as of 2013. There are 2 streets.

Geography 
Arbuzovka is located 42 km south of Pavlovsk (the district's administrative centre) by road. Kolyvanskoye is the nearest rural locality.

References 

Rural localities in Pavlovsky District, Altai Krai